The following tables provide a comparison of linear algebra software libraries, either specialized or general purpose libraries with significant linear algebra coverage.

Dense linear algebra

General information

Matrix types and operations 
Matrix types (special types like bidiagonal/tridiagonal are not listed):
 Real – general (nonsymmetric) real
 Complex – general (nonsymmetric) complex
 SPD – symmetric positive definite (real)
 HPD – Hermitian positive definite (complex)
 SY – symmetric (real)
 HE – Hermitian (complex)
 BND – band

Operations:
 TF – triangular factorizations (LU, Cholesky)
 OF – orthogonal factorizations (QR, QL, generalized factorizations)
 EVP – eigenvalue problems
 SVD – singular value decomposition
 GEVP – generalized EVP
 GSVD – generalized SVD

References

External links

Comparison of linear algebra libraries
Numerical analysis
Numerical linear algebra
Linear algebra libraries